The 2021 Halle Open (known for sponsorship reasons as the 2021 Noventi Open) was a tennis tournament played on outdoor grass courts. It was the 28th edition of the Halle Open and part of the ATP Tour 500 series of the 2021 ATP Tour. It took place at the OWL Arena in Halle, Germany, between 14 and 20 June 2021.

Champions

Singles

  Ugo Humbert def.  Andrey Rublev, 6–3, 7–6(7–4)

Doubles

  Kevin Krawietz /  Horia Tecău def.  Félix Auger-Aliassime /  Hubert Hurkacz, 7–6(7–4), 6–4

Points and prize money

Points distribution

Prize money 

*per team

ATP singles main draw entrants

Seeds

1 Rankings are as of 31 May 2021.

Other entrants
The following players received wildcards into the main draw:
  Daniel Altmaier
  Philipp Kohlschreiber  
  Gaël Monfils
  Stefanos Tsitsipas

The following player received entry as a special exempt:
  Jurij Rodionov

The following players received entry from the qualifying draw:
  Nikoloz Basilashvili
  Ričardas Berankis
  Marcos Giron
  Ilya Ivashka
  Lukáš Lacko
  Arthur Rinderknech

The following player received entry as a lucky loser:
  Yannick Hanfmann

Withdrawals 
Before the tournament
  Pablo Carreño Busta → replaced by  Corentin Moutet
  Cristian Garín → replaced by  Gilles Simon
  Casper Ruud → replaced by  Sam Querrey
  Stefanos Tsitsipas → replaced by  Yannick Hanfmann

ATP doubles main draw entrants

Seeds

1 Rankings are as of 31 May 2021.

Other entrants
The following pairs received wildcards into the doubles main draw:
  Daniel Altmaier /  Dominic Stricker
  Dustin Brown /  Jan-Lennard Struff
  Petros Tsitsipas /  Stefanos Tsitsipas

The following pair received entry from the qualifying draw:
  Daniel Masur /  Rudolf Molleker

The following pair received entry as a lucky loser:
  Yannick Hanfmann /  Dominik Koepfer

Withdrawals
Before the tournament
  Marcel Granollers /  Horacio Zeballos → replaced by  Andrés Molteni /  Guido Pella
  Łukasz Kubot /  Marcelo Melo → replaced by  Łukasz Kubot /  Édouard Roger-Vasselin
  Petros Tsitsipas /  Stefanos Tsitsipas → replaced by  Yannick Hanfmann /  Dominik Koepfer

References

External links 
 Official website